Klouček is a surname of Czech origin. Notable people with this surname include:

Celda Klouček (Celestýn Klouček) (1855–1935), Czech schulptor and palaeontologist
Josef Klouček (1905–1987), Czech skier, competitor in the 1928 Winter Olympics (military patrol)
Tomáš Klouček (born 1980), Czech ice hockey player

See also
Frank Kloucek (born 1956), Democrat politician from South Dakota, US

Czech-language surnames